The Knight of the Night , is a French comedy film from 1953, directed by Robert Darène, written by Jean Anouilh, starring Renée Saint-Cyr, Jean-Claude Pascal and Louis de Funès. The film is known under the titles: "Femmes de Paris", "Peek-a-boo" (USA).

Cast 
 Renée Saint-Cyr : Bella Fontanges, the dancer
 Jean-Claude Pascal : le chevalier Georges de Ségar and the unknown
 Louis de Funès : Adrien Péréduray, the suit
 Jean Servais : the owner of a manor 
 Grégoire Aslan : the prefect of police
 Annette Poivre : Blanche
 François Martin : the viscount of Saint-André, a manager
 Marie-José Darène : girl
 Hubert Noël : Raoul, the young man
 Pierre Destailles : the inspector Leblanc
 Jacques Dufilho : M. Machard, a policeman
 Lily Bontemps : the gommeuse
 Andrée Tainsy : Jeanne, the dresser of Bella
 Charlotte Ecard : the usherette
 Gilbert Edard : the doctor
 Luc Andrieux : the coachman

External links 
 
 Le Chevalier de la nuit (1954) at the Films de France

1953 films
French comedy films
1950s French-language films
French black-and-white films
Films directed by Robert Darène
Films based on works by Jean Anouilh
Films set in the 1880s
Films with screenplays by Jean Anouilh
1953 comedy films
1950s French films